Plus 7 dní Award TV Act of the Year

Currently held by  Peter Núñez

First awarded  | Last awarded 2003 | Present 

Plus 7 dní Award for TV Act of the Year has been bestowed to the most recognized television host of the past year in Slovakia since 2003. Originally known as the EuroTelevízia Award (2003–2006) and Život Award (2007-2015), the accolade is given as part of the annual OTO Awards ceremony by the Plus 7 dní magazine as the official announcer of the awards show, and local journalists.

Winners and nominees

2000s

2010s

Notes
† Denotes also a winner of the Absolute OTO category.

Superlatives

Multiple winners
 2 awards
 Téma dňa – TA3 (including Special Achievement Award)

References

External links
 OTO Awards (Official website)
 OTO Awards - Winners and nominees (From 2000 onwards)
 OTO Awards - Winners and nominees (From 2000 to 2009)

OTO Awards
Slovak culture
Slovak television awards
Awards established in 2000